Plataspidae (emended by some later authors as "Plataspididae", in violation of ICZN Code Article 29.5) are a family of shield bugs native to the Old World. They are a family of hemipteran insects (true bugs) of the suborder Heteroptera (typical bugs).

Genera

 Aphanopneuma
 Arefbea
 Bozius
 Brachyplatys
 Calacta
 Cantharodes
 Capuronia
 Catabrachyplatys
 Caternaultiella
 Ceratocoris
 Chinacoris
 Chinanops
 Codronchus
 Coptosoma
 Coptosomoides
 Cratoplatys
 Cronion
 Elapheozygum
 Emparka
 Erythrosomaspis
 Fieberisca
 Glarocoris
 Handlirschiella
 Hemitrochostoma
 Heterocrates
 Isoplatys
 Kuhlgatzia
 Libyaspis
 Livingstonisca
 Madegaschia
 Megacopta
 Merinjakia
 Montandoneus
 Montandonistella
 Neobozius
 Neocratoplatys
 Neotiarocoris
 Niamia
 Oncylaspis
 Oscula
 Paracopta
 Pelioderma
 Phyllomegacopta
 Ponsila
 Ponsilasia
 Probaenops
 Pseudoponsila
 Psocotoma
 Schizometopus
 Scleropelta
 Severiniella
 Spathocrates
 Tarichea
 Tetrisia
 Teuthocoris
 Thyreoprana
 Tiarocoris
 Tropidotylus
 Vetora
 Vigetus

Biology 
These bugs are phytophagous, polyphagous or oligophagous, mainly associated with the Fabaceae, but can also feed on plants of other families. Some may feed on fungi. 

They harbor microorganisms in their digestive tract, specific to each host species, living in symbiosis with it.

They are gregarious and can be found in large groups.

Social behaviors have been observed in Libyaspis : the adults, well protected by their pronotum and their scutellum covering the entire abdomen, group together at the base of the branches in which the larvae develop, thus preventing the access of predatory ladybug larvae.

Little is known about their biology.

Gallery

Distribution 
This family is of Old World origin only, found primarily in tropical and subtropical areas. Some species of Coptosoma are found in temperate areas. A few species have, however, been introduced to the American continent and some Pacific islands (such as Hawaii).

Only one genus occurs in Europe, Coptosoma, with only one widely distributed species, Coptosoma scutellatum and three Mediterranean species: C. sandahli in Sicily, C. costale in Cyprus, and C. mucronatum in the Balkans.

Species introduced to other areas 
Coptosoma xanthogramma was introduced to Hawaii in 1965.

Two species were introduced to the New World: Megacopta cribraria, introduced in 2009 to Georgia (United States), and Brachyplatys aeneus, introduced to Central America and Florida. M. cribraria quickly spread to other states in the American South, where it has become a pest of soybeans.

References

Shield bugs
Heteroptera families
Articles containing video clips